Helmut Howiller (born 27 June 1943) is a German judoka. He competed in the men's half-heavyweight event at the 1972 Summer Olympics.

References

External links
 

1943 births
Living people
German male judoka
Olympic judoka of East Germany
Judoka at the 1972 Summer Olympics
People from Wieruszów County
20th-century German people